The Legislative Assembly of Quebec (French: Assemblée législative du Québec) was the name of the lower house of Quebec's legislature from 1867 to December 31, 1968, when it was renamed the National Assembly of Quebec.  At the same time, the upper house of the legislature, the Legislative Council, was abolished.  Both were initially created by the Constitution Act, 1867.

It was the Union Nationale government of Premier Jean-Jacques Bertrand that passed the "Bill 90" legislation to abolish the upper house, but earlier attempts had been made by earlier governments.

The presiding officer of the Assembly was known in French as orateur, a literal translation of the English term, speaker. When the Assembly was renamed so too was the title of its presiding officer, becoming known as the President.

Today, Quebec has a unicameral legislature, whose single house is the National Assembly.

The large chamber that housed the assembly is also known as le salon bleu (the blue hall) because of the predominance of the colour on the walls. It used to be known as le salon vert (the green hall) until 1978, when the colour was changed to suit the televising of parliamentary debates.

References

Quebec
Quebec
Political history of Quebec

fr:Assemblée Législative du Québec
1867 establishments in Quebec
1968 disestablishments in Quebec